Stulce is a surname. Notable people with the surname include:

Arnold Stulce (1925–2020), American politician and businessman
Mike Stulce (born 1969), former American shot putter